Petra Engineering Industries Company is an industrial manufacturing company based in Jordan, that specializes in ventilating, heating and air-conditioning systems.

The company which was established in 1987, now exports to around 40 companies worldwide. The company managed to export its products to several locations in the United States, including NASA.

References

Heating, ventilation, and air conditioning companies
Companies based in Amman
Manufacturing companies established in 1987
Manufacturing companies of Jordan
Jordanian brands